William Giannobile is a leader in the field of periodontology and an internationally recognized scholar in oral regenerative medicine, tissue engineering, and precision medicine. Giannobile currently holds the position of Dean of Harvard School of Dental Medicine (HSDM), and began serving in this role in September 2020. Giannobile was named Dean of HSDM in April 2020. Prior to HSDM, he served as the Najjar Endowed Professor and chair of the Department of Periodontics and Oral Medicine at the University of Michigan School of Dentistry. He was also a professor of biomedical engineering at the College of Engineering and Biointerfaces Institute.

He received his DDS and MS in oral biology from the University of Missouri. He later received his certificate in periodontology and Doctor of Medical Sciences in oral biology from the Harvard School of Dental Medicine. He completed postdoctoral training in molecular biology at the Dana–Farber Cancer Institute and Harvard Medical School. Giannobile previously held positions as a faculty member at HSDM as an assistant professor of Periodontology and at the Forsyth Institute.  He has served as a visiting professor at the University of Genoa Medical School Biotechnology Institute and the Eastman Dental Institute, University College London.

Early life and education 
Giannobile was born in Chicago, Illinois.

In 1987, Giannobile received his Bachelor of Science in Biochemistry from Missouri University of Science and Technology. He received his Master of Science in Oral Biology and his Doctor of Dental Surgery from the University of Missouri in Kansas City. Giannobile went on to pursue a Doctor of Medical Sciences in Oral Biology and a certificate in Periodontology at the Harvard School of Dental Medicine. He completed a research fellowship in Periodontology at the Forsyth Institute in Boston, Massachusetts from 1996 to 1998. During this time, he also completed a post-doctoral fellowship in Molecular Biology at Dana–Farber Cancer Institute and Harvard Medical School.

Research 
Giannobile's research focuses on oral and periodontal regenerative medicine, tissue engineering and precision medicine. He has maintained a continuously NIH-funded research program over the past 25 years, and serves as co-principal investigator for the NIDCR-supported Michigan-Pittsburgh-Wyss Regenerative Medicine Resource Center. The goal of the center is to translate early stage dental, oral and craniofacial reconstructive technologies into clinical practice. He has produced over 300 manuscripts, textbook chapters, and patents focused on periodontology, regenerative medicine and oral health research. He is the editor or co-editor of nine books focused on clinical, translational research, periodontology and regenerative medicine. Giannobile recently completed a ten-year term as the editor-in-chief for the Journal of Dental Research, the official journal of the International Association for Dental Research. Giannobile is also a consultant to the U.S. Food and Drug Administration for Dental Devices. He serves as an associate editor for the upcoming report on the Surgeon General's Report on Oral Health – 2020.

Giannobile is a founding Board Member of the International Center for Genetic Disease (iCGD) at Brigham and Women's Hospital, Harvard Medical School, which focuses on the analysis of patients and healthy subjects from different parts of the world for genetics research into human disease and health.

Career 
Giannobile has held faculty appointments at Harvard School of Dental Medicine, University of Michigan, and Harvard University.

At Harvard School of Dental Medicine, Giannobile has served as dean and professor. (2020–present)

At the University of Michigan, Giannobile has held the roles of: assistant professor, associate professor, William K. and Mary Anne Najjar Endowed Professor, Director of the Michigan Center for Oral Health Research, professor, and department chair. (1998-2020)

Early on in his career, Giannobile served as a research fellow, instructor, and assistant professor at Harvard University. (1991-1998)

Giannobile has held appointments at several hospitals and affiliated institutions: University of Michigan School of Dentistry, University College London (London, United Kingdom), University of Genoa Medical School (Genoa, Italy), University of Milan (Milan Italy), Second University of Naples (Naples, Italy), Forsyth Institute (Cambridge, Massachusetts), Harvard Medical School (Boston, Massachusetts), and Dana–Farber Cancer Institute (Boston, Massachusetts).

Other professional positions include: Clinical Scientific Advisory Board, Rodo Medical; Board Member, Dental Products Panel, Medical Devices Advisory Committee, Center for Devices and Radiological Health, Food and Drug Administration (FDA); Clinical Scientific Advisory Board, Sunstar; Clinical Scientific Advisory Board, OraPharma, Inc.; Consultant, Dental Products Panel, Medical Devices Advisory, Committee, Center for Devices and Radiological Health, Food and Drug Administration (FDA); Clinical Scientific Advisory Board, Colgate Oral Pharmaceuticals; Scientific Advisory Board, Dentigenix, LLC; Scientific Advisory Board, BioMimetic Therapeutics, Inc.; Research Assistant, Department of Oral Biology, UMKC School of Dentistry; Chemist, U.S. Army Civil Service, Fort Leonard Wood, MO.

References

Periodontics and Oral Medicine William V. Giannobile, DDS, MS, DMSc, http://www.dent.umich.edu/about-school/department/pom/william-v-giannobile-dds-ms-dmsc (last visited Jul 23, 2016)

Year of birth missing (living people)
Living people
Periodontists
Harvard School of Dental Medicine alumni
University of Missouri alumni
Missouri University of Science and Technology alumni
University of Michigan faculty